Sofia Bekatorou (born 26 December 1977) is a Greek sailing champion.

She has participated in over hundreds of main class events including 2004 Summer Olympics sailing competition, where she won the gold medal in the women's double-handed dinghy event in the 470 with her pair Emilia Tsoulfa (Greece). After a serious back injury, she won a bronze medal in the yngling keelboat class at the 2008 Summer Olympics.

Bekatorou was the first female flag bearer for Greece in the history of Summer Olympics at the 2016 Summer Olympics in Rio de Janeiro, participating in the Olympic Games for the 4th time. She and partner Mike Pateniotis competed in the Nacra 17 event. They finished in 18th place.

#MeTinSofia

Bekatorou started the Hellenic #MeToo movement (#MeTinSofia) after revealing a sexual harassment and abuse episode involving a senior Hellenic Sailing Federation (HSF) member in his hotel room, shortly after trials for the 2000 Sydney Olympics. Soon, the senior was revealed to be Aristides Adamopoulos, the vice-president of HSF and also, a member of the New Democracy political party. The interview triggered a wave of resignations in the HSF and echoed massively across Greece and eventually inspired Zeta Douka and a number of other actors to come forward with their own stories of sexual harassment and abuse.

See also
 Sailing at the Summer Olympics

References

 
 
 Her involvement with International Children's Games

External links
 
 
 
 

1977 births
Living people
Sailors (sport) from Athens
Greek female sailors (sport)
Olympic gold medalists for Greece
Olympic bronze medalists for Greece
Olympic sailors of Greece
Sailors at the 2000 Summer Olympics – 470
Sailors at the 2004 Summer Olympics – 470
Sailors at the 2008 Summer Olympics – Yngling
Olympic medalists in sailing
Medalists at the 2008 Summer Olympics
Medalists at the 2004 Summer Olympics
European champions for Greece
ISAF World Sailor of the Year (female)
Sailors at the 2016 Summer Olympics – Nacra 17
World champions in sailing for Greece
470 class world champions